Chantepie (Gallo: Chauntepiy) is a commune of Rennes Métropole located in the Ille-et-Vilaine department in Brittany in northwestern France.

Population
Inhabitants of Chantepie are called Cantepiens in French.

See also
Communes of the Ille-et-Vilaine department

References

External links

Official website 
Mayors of Ille-et-Vilaine Association 

Communes of Ille-et-Vilaine